

References 

Steam frigates
Steam frigates list